The 2021–22 Swiss Super League (referred to as the Credit Suisse Super League for sponsoring reasons) was the 125th season of top-tier competitive football in Switzerland and the 19th under its current name and format.

A total of ten teams competed in the league: the eight best teams from the 2020–21 season, the 2020–21 Swiss Challenge League champions Grasshopper Club Zürich and relegation play-off winners Sion. Young Boys were the four-time defending champions.

Teams

Stadia and locations

Personnel and kits

Managerial changes

League table

Results

First and Second Rounds

Third and Fourth Rounds

Relegation play-offs 
The ninth-placed team of the Super League played the runners-up of the Challenge League. The games were held on 26 and 29 May 2022, respectively. The runner-up of the Challenge League hosted the first game.

FC Schaffhausen was confirmed as the runner-up of the Challenge League on 21 May 2022. On 22 May, FC Luzern was confirmed as their opponent.

First leg

Second leg 

FC Luzern wins 4–2 on aggregate.

Statistics

Players 
Player in italic is no longer part of the Super League.

Top scorers 
{| class="wikitable" style="text-align:center;font-size:95%"
|-
!width=15|
!width=15|
!Player
!Club
!Goals
|-
!rowspan="1"|1
|
|align=left|Jordan Pefok
|align=left|BSC Young Boys
|rowspan="1"|22
|-
!rowspan="1"|2
|
|align=left|Assan Ceesay
|align=left|FC Zürich
|rowspan="1"|20
|-
!rowspan="1"|3
|
|align=left|Kwadwo Duah
|align=left|FC St. Gallen
|rowspan="1"|15
|-
!rowspan="1"|4
|
|align=left|Arthur Cabral
|align=left|FC Basel
|rowspan="1"|14
|-
!rowspan="1"|5
|
|align=left|Antonio Marchesano
|align=left|FC Zürich
|rowspan="1"|13
|-
!rowspan="2"|6
|
|align=left|Wilfried Kanga
|align=left|BSC Young Boys
|rowspan="2"|12
|-
|
|align=left|Zeki Amdouni
|align=left|FC Lausanne-Sport
|-
!rowspan="3"|8
|
|align=left|Kastriot Imeri
|align=left|Servette FC
|rowspan="3"|11
|-
|
|align=left|Christian Fassnacht
|align=left|BSC Young Boys
|-
|
|align=left|Filip Stojilkovic
|align=left|FC Sion
|-

Assists 
{| class="wikitable" style="text-align:center;font-size:95%"
|-
!width=15|
!width=15|
!Player
!Club
!Assists
|-
!rowspan="1"|1
|
|align=left|Miroslav Stevanović
|align=left|Servette FC
|20
|-
!rowspan="1"|2
|
|align=left|Adrià Guerrero
|align=left|FC Zürich
|rowspan="1"|11
|-
!rowspan="1"|3
|
|align=left|Assan Ceesay
|align=left|FC Zürich
|rowspan="1"|10
|-
!rowspan="2"|4
|
|align=left|Lukas Görtler
|align=left|FC St. Gallen
|rowspan="2"|9
|-
|
|align=left|Víctor Ruiz
|align=left|FC St. Gallen
|-
!rowspan="2"|4
|
|align=left|Ermir Lenjani
|align=left|Grasshopper Club Zürich
|rowspan="2"|8
|-
|
|align=left|Sandi Lovrić
|align=left|FC Lugano
|-
!rowspan="7"|8
|
|align=left|Meschak Elia
|align=left|BSC Young Boys
|rowspan="7"|7
|-
|
|align=left|Moumi Ngamaleu
|align=left|BSC Young Boys
|-
|
|align=left|Anto Grgić
|align=left|FC Sion
|-
|
|align=left|Filip Ugrinic
|align=left|FC Luzern
|-
|
|align=left|Numa Lavanchy
|align=left|FC Lugano
|-
|
|align=left|Fabian Rieder
|align=left|BSC Young Boys
|-
|
|align=left|Mohamed Dräger
|align=left|FC Luzern
|-

Cards 
{| class="wikitable" style="text-align:center;font-size:95%"
|-
!width=15|
!width=15|
!Player
!Club
!width=15|
!width=15|
!width=15|
!width=15|
|-
!rowspan="1"|1
|
|align=left|Marvin Schulz
|align=left|FC Luzern
|10
|1
|1
|18
|-
!rowspan="1"|2
|
|align=left|Vincent Sasso
|align=left|Servette FC
|12
|0
|1
|17
|-
!rowspan="1"|3
|
|align=left|Batata
|align=left|FC Sion
|7
|1
|1
|15
|-
!rowspan="2"|4
|
|align=left|Jérémy Guillemenot
|align=left|FC St. Gallen
|8
|0
|1
|13
|-
|
|align=left|Olivier Custodio
|align=left|FC Lugano
|13
|0
|0
|13
|-
!rowspan="1"|6
|
|align=left|Lukas Görtler
|align=left|FC St. Gallen
|12
|0
|0
|12
|-
!rowspan="1"|7
|
|align=left|Christián Herc
|align=left|Grasshopper Club Zürich|
|8
|1
|0
|11
|-
!rowspan="3"|8
|
|align=left|Hicham Mahou
|align=left|FC Lausanne-Sport
|7
|1
|0
|10
|-
|
|align=left|Mirlind Kryeziu
|align=left|FC Zürich
|10
|0
|0
|10
|-
|
|align=left|Christopher Martins
|align=left|BSC Young Boys
|4
|2
|0
|10
|-

Clean Sheets (Goalkeepers) 
{| class="wikitable" style="text-align:center;font-size:95%"
|-
!width=15|
!width=15|
!Player
!Club
!width=15|
|-
!rowspan=1|1
|
|align=left|Heinz Lindner
|align=left|FC Basel
|rowspan=1|12
|-
!rowspan=1|2
|
|align=left|Yanick Brecher
|align=left|FC Zürich
|rowspan=1|10
|-
!rowspan=1|3
|
|align=left|Lawrence Ati-Zigi
|align=left|FC St. Gallen
|rowspan=1|7
|-
!rowspan=2|4
|
|align=left|Jérémy Frick
|align=left|Servette FC
|rowspan=2|5
|-
|
|align=left|Kevin Fickentscher
|align=left|FC Sion
|-
!rowspan=3|6
|
|align=left|Marius Müller
|align=left|FC Luzern
|rowspan=3|4
|-
|
|align=left|Amir Saipi
|align=left|FC Lugano
|-
|
|align=left|André Moreira
|align=left|Grasshopper Club Zürich
|-
!rowspan=1|9
|
|align=left|David von Ballmoos
|align=left|BSC Young Boys
|rowspan=1|3
|-
!rowspan=3|10
|
|align=left|Mory Diaw
|align=left|FC Lausanne-Sport
|rowspan=3|2
|-
|
|align=left|Noam Baumann
|align=left|FC Lugano
|-
|
|align=left|Guillaume Faivre
|align=left|BSC Young Boys

Notes

Teams

Attendance 

{| class="wikitable" style="text-align:center;font-size:95%"
|-
!width=15|
!Club
!Average
!Highest
!Lowest
!Total
|-
!1
|align=left|Young Boys
|24,821
|31,120
|19,973
|446,771
|-
!2
|align=left|Basel
|21,920
|33,810
|15,112
|394,561
|-
!3
|align=left|St. Gallen
|15,514
|18,861
|9,800
|279,257
|-
!4
|align=left|Zürich
|13,396
|22,413
|5,433
|241,124
|-
!5
|align=left|Luzern
|10,575
|13,491
|7,685
|190,355
|-
!6
|align=left|Sion
|6,983
|11,000
|3,500
|125,700
|-
!7
|align=left|Servette
|6,902
|11,348
|3,225
|124,229
|-
!8
|align=left|Grasshopper
|5,767
|16,112
|2,550
|103,800
|-
!9
|align=left|Lausanne
|5,066
|12,150
|2,745
|91,184
|-
!10
|align=left|Lugano
|2,935
|5,093
|2,098
|52,821
|-
!colspan=2|League total
!11,388
!33,810
!2,098
!2,049,802
|-

Fair Play 
On 1 June 2022, FC Lugano was awarded the Fair Play Trophy for the Credit Suisse Super League.
{| class="wikitable" style="text-align:center;font-size:95%"
|-
!width=15|
!Club
!width=15|
!width=15|
!width=15|
!width=15|
|-
!1
|align=left|Lugano
|85
|1
|1
|93
|-
!2
|align=left|Zürich
|92
|1
|0
|95
|-
!3
|align=left|Young Boys
|81
|5
|0
|96
|-
!4
|align=left|Servette
|76
|3
|3
|100
|-
!5
|align=left|Luzern
|82
|3
|2
|101
|-
!6
|align=left|Basel
|84
|3
|2
|103
|-
!7
|align=left|Grasshopper
|92
|3
|1
|106
|-
!8
|align=left|Sion
|90
|1
|3
|108
|-
!9
|align=left|St. Gallen
|80
|5
|3
|110
|-
!10
|align=left|Lausanne
|106
|5
|1
|126
|-
!colspan=2|League Total
!868
!30
!16
!1038
|-
!colspan=2|Average/game
!4.82
!0.167
!0.0889
!5.77

References

External links 
Official website
uefa.com
soccerway.com

Swiss Super League seasons
2021–22 in Swiss football
Swit